The 1962 Armstrong 500 was an endurance race for Australian built production cars. The race was held at the Phillip Island circuit in Victoria, Australia on 21 October 1962 over 167 laps of the 3.0 mile circuit, a total of 501 miles. Cars competed in four classes based on the retail price of each model. Officially, only class placings were awarded but the No 21 Ford Falcon driven by Harry Firth and Bob Jane was recognised as "First across the line". This was the third and last Armstrong 500 to be held at Phillip Island prior to the race being moved to the Mount Panorama Circuit at Bathurst in New South Wales where it later became known as the Bathurst 1000.

Class structure

For the 1962 race the division of classes was changed from engine capacity, used in the previous two Armstrong 500s, to the purchase price (in Australian pounds, the currency of the era) of the vehicle on the Australian market, with the intent to allow members of the public to make comparisons between cars which they could personally afford. An upper limit of £2000 was established to prevent the race from being dominated by purpose-built sports cars. These changes saw the Renault Gordinis move up from Class D to Class C, while the Volkswagens dropped from C to D. Volkswagen would break through for their first class victory this year.

Class A
Class A was for cars with a purchase price of between £1251 and £2000. The class featured Chrysler Valiant, Citroën ID19, Ford Zephyr, Studebaker Lark and Vauxhall Velox.

Class B
Class B was for cars with a purchase price of between £1051 and £1250. The class was dominated by the new Ford Falcon XL but also feature Austin Freeway and Holden EJ.

Class C
Class C was for cars with a purchase price of between £901 and £1050. The class featured Hillman Minx, Morris Major, Renault Gordini and Simca Aronde.

Class D
Class D was for cars with a purchase price of less than £900. The class featured Ford Anglia, Morris 850, Triumph Herald and Volkswagen.

Race
The race was dominated by the XL series Ford Falcon, three of which were amongst the first four finishers, led by the factory-supported car of defending winners Harry Firth and Bob Jane. On the same lap as Firth and Jane was the Class A winning Studebaker of Fred Sutherland and Bill Graetz, who won the class by four laps, defeating the factory-supported Ford Zephyr being driven by Geoff Russell and David Anderson, denying them a third consecutive class victory. This was as close as a Studebaker would get to an outright victory in the history of the event.

In Class C a Renault Gordini won despite being moved up from Class D with Rex Emmett, John Connolly and 1975 winner Brian Sampson winning by four laps. The Renault Gordini driven by Emmett, Connolly and Sampson which covered the most laps in Class C was initially disqualified after the race along with the Morris 850 driven by Allen and Hooker which crossed the line in second place in Class D. Appeals were lodged in both cases. Later published results show the cars as first in Class C and second in Class D respectively.

Jim McKeown, an emerging star in small capacity touring cars, and George Reynolds took their Volkswagen to the Class D victory, beating the leading Mini by a lap. Reynolds too had an outright victory in store in just two years time in 1964.

Aftermath
The toil placed on the cold mix bitumen surface by the race, with the largest entry the race had seen, overwhelmed the Phillip Island racetrack. Dangerous potholes formed all around the circuit, leaving a hefty repair bill, and an ominous threat to the future growth of the race. Staying at Phillip Island, as attractive as other factors presented, was plainly impossible and the search began by the promoters for a new home for the increasingly popular endurance production car race. Earlier the same year the Bathurst Six Hour Classic had been held at the Mount Panorama Circuit near Bathurst (won by a Daimler not eligible to run in the Armstrong), and that circuit immediately entered speculation.

Results

Statistics
 Fastest Lap - #3 Algie/Hibbard - 2:42
 Race Time - 8:15:16.0

References

Sources
Australian Motor Sports, December 1962
 
Australia's Greatest Motor Race, The First 30 Years, © 1989
The Age, Monday, 22 October 1962
Wheels, January 1963

External links
 1962 Armstrong 500 (race results), www.uniquecarsandparts.com.au
 1962 Armstrong 500 images, autopics.com.au

Armstrong 500
Armstrong 500
Motorsport at Phillip Island
October 1962 sports events in Oceania